CCGS Cape Hurd is a  mid-shore patrol vessel formerly serving with the Canadian Coast Guard and last stationed in Sarnia, Ontario. The vessel is classed for inland waters (Great Lakes) with no ice-class. It now serves as a fireboat in Toronto.

History

Cape Hurd was built by the now defunct Breton Industries Limited in Port Hawkesbury, Nova Scotia and delivered to the CCG in 1982. The ship was decommissioned by the Coast Guard and acquired by the Toronto Fire Services The ship entered service as William Thornton, named for William Thornton, the first Toronto fire fighter to die on duty. The ship replaced , another ex-Coast Guard vessel. William Thornton is berthed at Station 334 along Queens Quay.

The vessel offers more capability than Sora as backup to the main fireboat , but it does not have ice-breaking capabilities and removed from the waters during the winter. The vessel is equipped with a small crane and can launch a RHIB from the rear of the vessel. Upgrades were performed before it entered service with the TFS.

See also

Other utility ships in CCG:

  - sister ship to Cape Hurd built in 1980 by same builder and sold by CCG
  - a large mid shore vessel built at same shipbuilder as Cape Hurd in 1977

References

External links
 Canadian Coast Guard ship adopted by Toronto Fire Service

Ships of the Canadian Coast Guard
Fireboats of Toronto Fire Services
1982 ships
Ships built in Nova Scotia